Henry Peters may refer to:

 Henry Peters (British politician) (c. 1763–1827)
 Henry Peters (Australian politician) (1881–1918), member of the New South Wales Legislative Assembly
 Henry M. Peters (1889–1987), American politician
 Henry Peters (baseball) (Hank Peters, 1924–2015), American baseball executive

See also
 Henry Peter (born 1957), French-Swiss business lawyer
 Henry Peters House, a historic home built around 1910 in DeKalb County, Indiana
 Harry Peters (c. 1788–1870), Canadian politician
 Harry Peters (mountaineer) (1852–1941), German-born New Zealand mountaineer